Debbie Greenwood (born 16 September 1959 in Liverpool) is a British television presenter and a former beauty queen who won the title of Miss Great Britain in 1984.

Career
Greenwood began her broadcasting career in 1984, presenting regional programmes for Granada Television. She then moved on to the BBC's Breakfast Time (1985–1986), which included broadcasting from a special studio outside Buckingham Palace for the wedding of Prince Andrew and Sarah Ferguson. In 1986, she also appeared in the BBC2 comedy Naked Video; a reviewer of the first episode wrote, "Among the more hilarious moments was an interview with the father of a kidnap victim by Breakfast Times Debbie Greenwood, a presenter who would make a cattle-tick blush."

During 1987–1989, she presented on BBC Radio 2 daytime programmes, beginning with standing in for Gloria Hunniford at Christmas 1987. She later presented Streetwise (1989–1990) for The Channel 4 Daily. She also presented the UK version of the short-lived game show Love Me, Love Me Not in 1988, as well as the more successful BBC quiz for schoolchildren First Class, which aired on BBC1 from 1986 to 1988.

Greenwood has since been seen on a variety of UK-based satellite and cable shopping channels, including TV Travel Shop, Bid TV, The Craft Channel, and most notably, twelve years presenting for QVC, starting in 2001.

Personal life
Greenwood is married to broadcaster Paul Coia, with whom she has two daughters.

References

1959 births
Living people
English television presenters
Television presenters from Liverpool
English beauty pageant winners
QVC people
BBC Radio 2 presenters